The 1954 Boston University Terriers football team was an American football team that represented Boston University as an independent during the 1954 college football season. In its eighth season under head coach Aldo Donelli, the team compiled a 7–2 record and outscored opponents by a total of 256 to 93.

Schedule

References

Boston University
Boston University Terriers football seasons
Boston University Terriers football